On 20 September 2019, a bomb exploded on a minibus near Karbala, Iraq, killing 12 civilians and injuring at least five others. The bombing was one of the worst attacks against civilians since the end of the War in Iraq of 2013 to 2017.

Attack
An unidentified man boarded a minibus in the southern Iraqi city of Karbala, disembarking a little later leaving a bag behind. It exploded shortly afterwards, killing 12 and wounding five others. A suspect was later arrested and the Islamic State of Iraq and the Levant claimed responsibility.

References

2019 murders in Iraq
Islamic State insurgency in Iraq (2017–present)
2019 bombing
21st-century mass murder in Iraq
Bus bombings in Asia
Car and truck bombings in Iraq
2019 bombing
2019 bombing
Improvised explosive device bombings in 2019
ISIL terrorist incidents in Iraq
Islamic terrorist incidents in 2019
Mass murder in 2019
September 2019 crimes in Asia
Terrorist incidents in Iraq in 2019